Remus is an unincorporated community in Paulding County, in the U.S. state of Georgia.

History
A post office called Remus was established in 1885, and remained in operation until 1903. The community was named after Uncle Remus, the titular fictional narrator of a collection of stories by Joel Chandler Harris.

References

Unincorporated communities in Paulding County, Georgia
Unincorporated communities in Georgia (U.S. state)